The 1994 Florida gubernatorial election was held on November 8, 1994. Incumbent governor Lawton Chiles, a Democrat, survived a strong challenge from businessman Jeb Bush, a Republican, to win re-election. This race was the second-closest gubernatorial election in Florida history since Reconstruction, due to the strong Republican wave of 1994.

Democrats held the Governor's Mansion until 1998 where Bush would win the election.

Background
Incumbent Lawton Chiles was eligible to run for a second four-year term under the Constitution of Florida. In late 1991, Chiles's disapproval rating rose significantly after he cut funds for education in his first budget. Around 75% of Floridians gave him a fair or poor performance rating. The following year, Chiles's approval rating fell to only 22% and his disapproval reached 76% after the state's perceived inadequate response to Hurricane Andrew. His disapproval rating remained as high as 71% into 1993. As a result, some Democrats suggested that U.S. Senator Bob Graham run for a third, non-consecutive term as governor.

Candidates

Democratic
Lawton Chiles, incumbent Governor of Florida
Jack Gargan, retired financial planner

Republican
Josephine A. Arnold
Bob Bell
Jeb Bush, former Florida Secretary of Commerce, businessman, and son of former President of the United States George H. W. Bush
Kenneth L. Connor
Ander Crenshaw, State Senator
Tom Gallagher, Treasurer of Florida
James C. Smith, Florida Secretary of State, former Attorney General of Florida

Others
George "G. G." Boone, self-employed carpenter
Calvin "C. C." Reed, former trucking and moving industry worker

Primary results

Democratic primary

Republican primary
A runoff primary election was scheduled to be held between leading candidate Jeb Bush and second-place candidate James C. Smith because no candidate received a majority of the vote. However, Smith dropped out of the race a few days later, leaving Bush as the Republican nominee for governor.

General election

Campaign
Bush ran as a political conservative, and tried to paint Chiles as beholden to liberal interests. At one point, when asked what he would do for African Americans, Bush responded: "It's time to strive for a society where there's equality of opportunity, not equality of results. So I'm going to answer your question by saying: probably nothing."

The final weeks of the campaign was described as "one of the nastiest in Florida political history."

On October 18, a debate that was broadcast by 36 radio stations was held at Walt Disney World in Orlando. Bush and Chiles stood behind two lecterns decorated with Mickey Mouse ears.

Another debate between Bush and Chiles was conducted by the League of Women Voters of Florida at Tampa Performing Arts Center on November 1. Early in the debate, Chiles again criticized Bush's ad about the death penalty, stating that Bush had outdone his father's ad about Willie Horton and saying "You knew [the ad] was false. You admitted it was false. And I am ashamed that you would use the loss of a mother in an ad like this." Later, during a discussion about school vouchers, Chiles quipped "My mama told me, 'sticks and stones will break my bones,' but names will never hurt me. But let me tell you one other thing about the old liberal. The old He-Coon walks just before the light of day."  This referenced Chiles' Florida cracker roots, and served as a deliberate contrast with the more urbane Bush.

In a poll conducted by Associated Industries of Florida between November 3 and November 4, Chiles led Bush by 48%-43%, with a margin of error of 3.5%.

On the day before the election, a bloc of Chiles' campaign used get-out-the-vote phone calls to about 70,000 people. These calls alleged that Bush was a "tax cheat" and that his running mate Tom Feeney planned to destroy Social Security. The information was falsely attributed to a "tax fairness" and a senior citizen advocacy organizations. Chiles denied authorizing the phone calls but still later apologized when the media discovered top officials in his campaign had authorized them.  When the Florida legislature investigated the calls, Chiles claimed he was "out of the loop." Chiles' ultimate margin of victory in the election was less than 64,000 votes.

Throughout the campaign, Bush raised approximately $7 million, more than half of which came from fundraisers featuring his parents and out-of-state fundraisers sponsored by his family and friends. On each of Barbara and George H. W. Bush's visits to Florida, they raked in about $1 million for the campaign. Chiles limited contributions to $100 per person and raised $6.23 million, which included $2 million in public money.

Polling

Results
Chiles prevailed against Bush, winning 2,135,008 votes against Bush's 2,071,068 – a margin of about 1.52%. Additionally, write-in candidates G. G. Boone and C. C. Reed garnered 556 and 27 votes, respectively. With the election occurring during the 1994 Republican Revolution, Chiles was one of only two Democratic governors nationwide in close competitive races to hold onto his seat that night (the other being Zell Miller). In Florida alone, Republicans took over the State Senate for the first time in over a century, U.S. Senator Connie Mack III was re-elected in a landslide, Sandra Mortham defeated Ron Saunders for Secretary of State, Gerald A. Lewis was ousted by Robert Milligan for Comptroller, and Frank Brogan, who would run as Bush's running mate in 1998, was re-elected as Commissioner of Education. Also following in the conservative tone of the night, a statewide ballot initiative to legalize casino gambling was defeated in a 62%-38% landslide.

During the course of the campaign, Chiles again successfully carried out his "Dixie-Dade Strategy"—winning both Dixie and Dade (now known as Miami-Dade) counties. Chiles also carried the other two major metropolitan counties in the South Florida – Broward and Palm Beach. However, he failed to win the Cuban voters in Miami. In comparison with the 1990 election, Chiles performed significantly worse in North and Central Florida, where he lost his native Polk County. Although he lost several counties in the Panhandle, Chiles' largest margin of victory was in Gadsden County – the only predominantly African-American county in Florida. Bush received his highest percentages of victory in several rural counties in the northern portion of the state, especially Baker, Clay, and Union counties.

By county

Aftermath
After the election, the controversial phone calls were labeled "phonegate." Bill Cotterell of the Tallahassee Democrat believed that the phone calls did not affect the result of the election: "I'm quite sure you know, at least half of them just hung up, never even listened to the message. And those who did probably said, well, that's ridiculous, the governor of Florida ... or the lieutenant governor of Florida can't repeal Social Security."  Miami Herald writer Mark Silva also argued that phonegate did not impact the outcome of the election, saying that "[the] campaign was won before that happened. The idea that that somehow tipped the election was a canard, it wasn't true." In November 1995, Bush's campaign manager, J. M. "Mac" Stipanovich noted that "it's quite possible the Chiles campaign stole the election by fraud". Bush himself refused to speculate on the impact of the phone calls.

Chiles testified under oath before a state legislative committee in December 1995, becoming the first modern governor of Florida to do so. He told the Senate Executive Business, Ethics, and Elections Committee that he had no knowledge of the "scare calls." After apologizing to any Floridians who may have been misled, the attempt to tie him to phonegate was reduced to a one-man operation led by then-State Senator Charlie Crist. Later, Chiles passed a law banning false attributions for get-out-the-vote phone calls. Chiles remained governor of Florida until suffering a fatal heart attack on December 12, 1998, less than a month before his second term expired.

After his father lost re-election for President of the United States in 1992, Jeb planned on running for president in 2000 after serving for six years as Governor of Florida. However, because he lost this election, his brother George, who was elected Governor of Texas on the same night, instead ran for president in 2000. Jeb did run for governor again, however; he defeated Chiles' lieutenant governor Buddy MacKay in 1998 and easily won re-election in 2002. Bush eventually did run for President in 2016 but was defeated in the Republican Party primary by Donald Trump.

Videos
(1) Florida Gubernatorial Debate from November 1, 1994 

(2) Florida Gubernatorial Debate from October 18, 1994 

(3) Florida Gubernatorial Debate from October 4, 1994

References

1994
Florida
Gubernatorial
Jeb Bush